Fußball Club Südburgenland, also known as HOCO Südburgenland for sponsorship reasons, is an Austrian women's football club from Olbendorf, a town in South Burgenland, hence its name. Founded in 2002 after the women's team of SC Pinkafeld decided to become an independent club, it has played in the ÖFB-Frauenliga since the 2003–04 season. 

After debuting with a fourth position and reaching the national cup's final, where it was trashed by SV Neulengbach (0–12), the team spent the six following seasons in the bottom half of the table, but it was never relegated. In 2011 Südburgenland was the championship's runner-up with a 13–3–2 record, and in 2012 it was fourth. It has also reached the cup's semifinals in three of the last fourth seasons as of 2012.

2021–22 squad

Competition record

References

Women's football clubs in Austria
2002 establishments in Austria
Association football clubs established in 2002
FC Sudburgenland